Josephine Nordstrøm Olsen (born 7 May 1998) is a Danish handball player for Viborg HK and the Danish junior national team.

References

1998 births
Living people
Danish female handball players
People from Køge
Sportspeople from Region Zealand